Quincey Daniels (born August 4, 1941, in San Diego, California) is an American former welterweight boxer.

Amateur
Daniels, boxing at 139 pounds, captured a bronze medal for the United States, at the 1960 Rome Olympiad. At the time of the Olympics, Daniels was in the United States Air Force. Daniels was also the 1959 United States Amateur Lightweight champion and the 1970 United States Amateur Light welterweight champion.

1960 Olympic results
Below is the record of Quincey Daniels, an American light welterweight boxer who competed at the 1960 Rome Olympics:

 Round of 64: bye
 Round of 32: defeated Alexsandr Mitsev (Bulgaria) by decision, 5-0
 Round of 16: defeated Bobby Kelsey (Great Britain) by decision, 4-1
 Quarterfinal: defeated Sayed El-Nahas (United Arab Republic) by decision, 5-0
 Semifinal: lost to Bohumil Nemecek (Czechoslovakia) by decision, 0-5 (was awarded bronze medal)

References

External links
 

1941 births
Living people
Boxers from San Diego
Boxers at the 1960 Summer Olympics
Olympic bronze medalists for the United States in boxing
Medalists at the 1960 Summer Olympics
American male boxers
United States Air Force airmen
Boxers at the 1963 Pan American Games
Pan American Games medalists in boxing
Pan American Games bronze medalists for the United States
Light-welterweight boxers
Medalists at the 1963 Pan American Games